Paul de la Cruz Mulders (born 16 January 1981) is a Filipino professional footballer who plays as an attacking midfielder. He was last signed by Ceres–Negros of the Philippines Football League. Mulders is also a member of the Philippines national team. He previously played for HFC Haarlem, FC Omniworld, AGOVV Apeldoorn, ADO Den Haag, Global Cebu and Cambuur.

Club career

Early years
Born in Amsterdam, Mulders is the youngest son of Dutchman Leo Mulders and Filipina mother Ofelia de la Cruz from Isabela, Ilagan. Mulders started youth football at A.V.V. Zeeburgia at age four until he was scouted by Ajax at age eight and trained at the Ajax Academy until he was 16.

HFC Haarlem
Mulders continued on to HFC Haarlem in 1997 where many former Ajax youth players have gone to continue their football pursuits. He made his professional debut in the Eerste Divisie at the age of 19 on 14 October 2000 against BV Veendam. Notably, on 6 August 2003, Mulders netted a goal against the opposition team consisting of Zlatan Ibrahimović and Wamberto during a friendly match against Ajax at the Amsterdam Arena. He won 114 appearances and scored 20 goals for Haarlem as a winger from 2000–2005 and impressed upon head trainer, Roy Wesseling.

Cambuur
As a free agent after the 2005 season, Wesseling brought Mulders and co-Haarlem teammate Rick Hooijboer with him to Cambuur. The then 24-year-old Mulders signed a two-year contract with the Frisian club. He would make sixty appearances for the Leeuwarders and score five goals as a forward. Cambuur, bogged by financial problems had failed expectations to climb the Jupiler League rankings in Mulders' second season with the club. As a result, he and six other players' contracts were not renewed.

FC Omniworld
Before the 2007–08 season got underway, Mulders had a brief failed pro-adventure in Austria during the summer break before finally signing with FC Omniworld in his backyard of Almere for two seasons. Poised to play his naturally preferred position as an attacking midfielder or as a shadow striker, he scored eleven goals in sixty appearances. In Omniworld, he met and clicked with assistant trainer Peter van Vossen who he would later meet again at AGOVV.

AGOVV Apeldoorn
On 3 February 2009, it was announced that Mulders had signed with AGOVV in Apeldoorn for two seasons and began his training in earnest in the summer of that same year with coaches John van den Brom and Peter van Vossen. It was while under the tutelage of Van den Brom that Mulders flourished with the team and in tandem played his best season yet in 2009–10 with the likes of teammates Nacer Chadli, Ramon Leeuwin, Chiró N'Toko, Jeremy Bokila, where AGOVV reached the promotion play-offs. In late April 2011, it was announced that he signed a two-year deal with an option for another year with ADO Den Haag.

ADO Den Haag
It was widely reported in August 2010, that Mulders' former coach at AGOVV Apeldoorn, John van den Brom, wanted to bring him to his new club ADO Den Haag, but talks for a transfer fell through. During the end of the winter transfer window, in January 2011 Zwolle was reportedly pursuing Mulders for a last minute mid-season transfer. In late April 2011, it was announced that he signed a two-year deal with an option for another year with ADO Den Haag.

Mulders made his UEFA Europa League debut for Den Haag on 4 August 2011,<ref name=MST13>{{cite news|url=http://www.haaglandenvoetbal.nl/?pid=63&news%5Biid%5D=9901|title=Paul Mulders: "Immers en Bulykin niet vergelijken, het zijn verschillende spelers |language=Dutch |author=Duijzer, Glenn |publisher=Haaglanden Voetbal |date=9 August 2011 |accessdate=29 January 2012}}</ref> appearing as a substitute for Ahmed Ammi in the 32nd minute against Cypriot club Omonia in the third qualifying round. Den Haag won 1–0 but lost 3–1 on aggregate.

After 11 seasons in the Eerste Divisie, Mulders made his debut in the Eredivisie on 7 August 2011 against Vitesse.

Chiangrai United
In January 2013, it has been reported that Mulders had received an offer from  Chiangrai United in the Thai Premier League, but both parties did not reach a final agreement before the winter transfer window closed.

Prior to the end of Mulders' contract with ADO Den Haag, and with the support of former teammate Adnan Barakat from Cambuur, Mulders travelled to Thailand in July 2013 to play a test match for Chiangrai United. Chiangrai's new head coach, however, did not extend him an offer to join the team.

Global FC
As a free agent, in July 2013 Mulders lent his services to Global FC ahead their campaign for the Singapore Cup.

Cambuur
On 20 January 2014, Mulders signed an amateur deal with Dutch Eredivisie side Cambuur until the end of the 2013–14 season.

Ceres Negros and Global Cebu
Mulders moved to Ceres Negros, then playing as Ceres in the United Football League, in 2014 after his second Cambuur stint. He later had a second stint with Global (now Global Cebu) and played for them for the first half of the 2018 Philippines Football League season before  returning to Ceres in July 2018.

International career
Shortly after the announcement of Mulders' transfer to ADO Den Haag, his friends and a cousin set up a Facebook fanpage for him. The page was then forwarded to the Philippine Football Federation and within a week he was invited to come to Manila to join the national team. Mulders cited that based on his football resume, video compilations and the fact that he had signed with ADO that he made the selection.

In early June 2011, he arrived in Manila and obtained his Philippine passport. He was named into the final squad for their 2014 FIFA World Cup qualification first round match against Sri Lanka. On 29 June 2011, Mulders made his debut for the Philippines in Colombo, as they drew 1–1 with Sri Lanka. Philippines wins the return match in Manila at 4–0 and advances to the second round qualifiers against Kuwait . He would miss the Kuwait matches due to a leg wound infection incurred from a sliding tackle in Colombo.		

On 7 October 2011, Mulders would again reprise his role in a friendly match against Singapore with a 2–0 loss for the Philippines. Following a friendly match against Nepal on 11 October 2011, the Philippines won 4–0 where Mulders played an instrumental role providing an assist to Phil Younghusband's goal in the 17th minute.

Retirement
On 16 March 2016, Azkals team manager Dan Palami confirmed that Mulders has retired from playing at international level. He has since returned to play again for the Azkals.

International goalsScores and results list the Philippines' goal tally first.''

References

External links
Paul Mulders career stats at Voetbal International

Paul Mulders profile at UEFA Europa League

1981 births
Living people
Footballers from Amsterdam
Citizens of the Philippines through descent
Dutch people of Filipino descent
Dutch footballers
Filipino footballers
Filipino expatriate footballers
Filipino people of Dutch descent
Philippines international footballers
Association football midfielders
ADO Den Haag players
AFC Ajax players
AGOVV Apeldoorn players
SC Cambuur players
HFC Haarlem players
Almere City FC players
Eredivisie players
Eerste Divisie players
Global Makati F.C. players
Ceres–Negros F.C. players